{{Infobox writer  
| name = Kao Kalia Yang
| honorific_prefix = 
| honorific_suffix = 
| image = 
| image_size = 
| alt = 
| caption = 
| native_name = 
| native_name_lang = |
| birth_name = 
| birth_date = 1980   
| birth_place = Ban Vinai Refugee Camp
| death_date = 
| death_place = 
| resting_place = 
| occupation = Writer
| language = Hmong
| nationality = American
| citizenship = U.S.A.
| alma_mater = Carleton College (BA)Columbia University (MFA)
| period = 
| genre = 
| subject = 
| movement = 
| notableworks = The Latehomecomer: A Hmong Family Memoir and The Song Poet 
| spouse = 
| partner = 
| children = 
| relatives = 
| awards = 
| signature = 
| signature_alt = 
| years_active = 
| module = 
| website = 
| portaldisp = 
}}
Kao Kalia Yang (born 1980) is a Hmong American writer and author of The Latehomecomer: A Hmong Family Memoir from Coffee House Press and The Song Poet from Metropolitan Press. Her work has appeared in the Paj Ntaub Voice Hmong literary journal, "Waterstone~Review," and other publications. She is a contributing writer to On Being's Public Theology Reimagined blog. Additionally, Yang wrote the lyric documentary, The Place Where We Were Born. Yang currently resides in St. Paul, Minnesota.

Early life
Born in Ban Vinai Refugee Camp in December, 1980, Yang came to Minnesota in the summer of 1987, along with her parents and older sister Dawb.  Yang says that the move to America was necessary for her parents.  Her mother suffered six miscarriages after giving birth to her, and with no male heir, her father was being pressured to find a second wife.  He even took his younger daughter on trips with him to visit eligible women in the camp.  For Yang's parents, leaving Ban Vinai was not only about finding opportunity for their two daughters, but also rescuing themselves from family and cultural pressure.
Yang says that while her sister mastered the English language quickly, she struggled for many years, finally discovering that her gift lay not in the spoken, but in the written word.  Yang credits her older sister Dawb, with awakening an interest within her:
 

Yang also credits her 9th grade English teacher, Mrs. Gallatin, with recognizing and encouraging her talents.  Upon graduation from Harding High School, she attended Carleton College, though she was by no means certain of her future plans when she began her college career.

Education
Yang graduated from Carleton College in 2003 with a bachelor's degree in American Studies, Women's and Gender Studies, and Cross-cultural Studies. Yang received her Master's of Fine Arts in Creative Nonfiction Writing from Columbia University in New York City. Her graduate studies were supported by a Dean's Fellowship from the School of the Arts and The Paul & Daisy Soros Fellowships for New Americans.

Beginning at age 12, Yang taught English as a second language to adult refugees. As a student, Yang privately tutored students, and taught creative nonfiction writing workshops to professionals, including professors from Rutgers University and New York University. Yang has also taught the fundamentals of writing to students at Concordia University in St. Paul and courses in composition at St. Catherine University. She was a professor in the English department at the University of Wisconsin-Eau Claire for the 2010-2011 academic year. In 2014, Yang served as a mentor for the Loft Mentor Series. She taught at North Hennepin Community College in 2015 as visiting faculty in the English Department. Recently, Yang was the Benedict Distinguished Visiting Faculty in American Studies and English at Carleton College.

Published works
Nonfiction

 The Latehomecomer: A Hmong Family Memoir (2008)  
 The Song Poet: A Memoir of My Father (2016)  
 What God is Honored Here?: Writings on Miscarriage and Infant Loss By and For Women of Color (coedited with Shannon Gibney, 2019)  
 Somewhere in the Unknown World: A Collective Refugee Memoir (2021)

Children's Books

 A Map Into the World (2019), illustrated by Seo Kim
 The Most Beautiful Thing (2020), illustrated by Khoa Le
 The Shared Room (2020), illustrated by Xee Reiter
 Yang Warriors (2021), illustrated by Billy Thao

Awards and recognition
Kao Kalia Yang has been a recipient of the Alan Page Scholarship, the Gilman International Award, and the Freeman in Asia Scholarship.

Yang was a Columbia University's School of the Arts Dean's fellow, a Paul and Daisy Soros fellow, and a McKnight Arts fellow.

Yang won the 2005 Lantern Book's essay contest for an essay titled "To the Men In My Family Who Love Chickens."

In 2008, Carleton College awarded her with the Spirit of Carleton College Award.

Yang has been the recipient of several Minnesota State Arts Board artist grants.

In 2009 her first book The Latehomecomer won Minnesota Book Awards for memoir/creative nonfiction as well as the Reader's Choice Award—the first book to ever win two awards in the same year. The book was a finalist for a PEN USA Literary Center Award and an Asian American Literary Award. The book remains a bestselling title for Coffee House Press. "The Latehomecomer" is a National Endowment of the Arts' Big Read book.

Yang's second book, The Song Poet, is the winner of the 2017 MN Book Award in Creative Nonfiction/Memoir. It was a finalist for the National Book Critics Circle Award and the Chautauqua Prize. The book is now a finalist for a PEN USA literary award in nonfiction and the Dayton's Literary Peace Prize.

In 2020 Yang's children's book A Map into the World'', illustrated by Seo Kim, received a Charlotte Zolotow Award Honor for outstanding writing in a picture book.

Controversies
On September 24, 2012, Radiolab aired a segment on yellow rain and the Hmong people, during which Robert Krulwich interviewed Yang and her uncle Eng Yang.  During the two-hour interview, of which less than five minutes was aired, Yang was brought to the point of tears over "Robert's harsh dismissal of my uncle's experience."

Following a public outcry, Krulwich issued an apology on September 30 writing, "I now can hear that my tone was oddly angry. That's not acceptable -- especially when talking to a man who has suffered through a nightmare in Southeast Asia that was beyond horrific."

The podcast itself was later amended on October 5, and according to Yang "On October 7, I received an email from Dean Cappello, the Chief Content Officer at WNYC, notifying me that Radiolab had once more "amended" the Yellow Rain podcast so that Robert could apologize at the end, specifically to Uncle Eng for the harshness of his tone and to me for saying that I was trying to "monopolize" the conversation. I listened to the doctored version. In addition to Robert's apologies—which completely failed to acknowledge the dismissal of our voices and the racism that transpired/s -- Radiolab had simply re-contextualized their position, taken out the laughter at the end, and "cleaned" away incriminating evidence."

Yang noted in particular: "Everybody in the show had a name, a profession, institutional affiliation except Eng Yang, who was identified as "Hmong guy," and me, "his niece." The fact that I am an award-winning writer was ignored. The fact that my uncle was an official radio man and documenter of the Hmong experience to the Thai government during the war was absent."

This incident stirred up issues of white privilege, with many  accusing Radiolab and Krulwich of being insensitive to racial matters.

Sources 
2005 Lantern Books Interview With Kao Kalia Yang
Interview with Kao Kalia Yang by Peter Shea

References

Further reading

External links
 Kao Kalia Yang's Official Website kaokaliayang.com

Hmong writers
American memoirists
Screenwriters from Wisconsin
1980 births
Living people
University of Wisconsin–Eau Claire faculty
Vietnamese emigrants to the United States
Carleton College alumni
Columbia University School of the Arts alumni
Screenwriters from Minnesota